Gavin Pfitzner (born 1 September 1966) is a former professional tennis player from Australia.

Biography
Pfitzner, who comes from South Australia, is the son of a tennis player. His father, Trevor, played against Marty Mulligan at the 1959 Australian Championships. He was coached during his career by one of his father's contemporaries Barry Phillips-Moore.

Competing on the professional tour in the 1980s, Pfitzner made all of his Grand Prix main draw appearances in doubles, which included making the semi-finals of the 1987 Bordeaux Open with Richard Fricker. He played in the main draws of doubles events at both the Australian Open and Wimbledon on multiple occasions between 1987 and 1990.

He now coaches tennis at the Modbury Tennis Club in Adelaide.

Challenger titles

Doubles: (1)

References

External links
 
 

1966 births
Living people
Australian male tennis players
Tennis people from South Australia